Nueva Toltén is a Chilean town in Toltén commune, Cautín Province, Araucania Region. It is located near the mouth of Toltén River that drains Villarrica Lake, it is also  SW of Temuco. Nueva Toltén was founded after the original community, Toltén, was destroyed by the tsunami of the Great Chilean earthquake. It has 2293 inhabitants. The name originates from the Mapuche language meaning "meeting place of different waters".

References

See also
 List of towns in Chile

Populated places established in 1866
Populated places in Cautín Province
1866 establishments in Chile